Nikki Gouman (also known as Nikki Nola; born 21 December 1983) is a Dutch singer and the winner of the fourth series of Idols, the Dutch variant on Pop Idol. On the first of March 2008 she won the singing contest with 62% of all the votes from the other finalist Nathalie Makoma
.

Her single "Perfect Day" will also be released in the rest of Europe as her European debut single.

Idols
During the fourth series of Idols, Kerkhof performed the songs:
 Idols4Live: Super Duper Love (Joss Stone)
 Liveshow 1 (Las Vegas): Pretty Vegas (INXS)
 Liveshow 2 (The '80s): Tell It To My Heart (Taylor Dayne)
 Liveshow 3 (Dutch Product): Rain Down On Me (Kane)
 Liveshow 4 (Disco): If I Can't Have You (Yvonne Elliman)
 Liveshow 5 (Musical): Climb Every Mountain (The Sound of Music)
 Liveshow 6 (Britpop): Bleeding Love (Leona Lewis)
 Liveshow 7 (Dutch Songs): Afscheid (Volumia!)
 Liveshow 8 (Love): River Deep, Mountain High (Tina Turner), From This Moment (Shania Twain)
 Liveshow 9 (Bigband): Valerie (Amy Winehouse), I Who Have Nothing (Shirley Bassey)
 Liveshow 10 (Songs selected by Radio 538-DJs): Mesmerized (Faith Evans), All My Life (Krezip)
 Liveshow 11 (Final): River Deep, Mountain High (Tina Turner), When The Spirit Of The Lord (Fred Hammond), Queen Of The Night (Whitney Houston), On My Own (Michael McDonald & Patti LaBelle), "Hello World" (first single).

Discography

The following is a complete discography of every album and single released by Dutch pop music artist Nikki Kerkhof.

Albums

Singles

References

External links
 Official website
 

1983 births
Living people
Dutch pop singers
Idols (TV series) winners
People from Sint-Oedenrode
21st-century Dutch singers
21st-century Dutch women singers